Harpalus badakschanus is a species of ground beetle in the subfamily Harpalinae. It was described by Jedlicka in 1956.

References

badakschanus
Beetles described in 1956